Ponoka may refer to: 
Ponoka, Alberta, a town in Canada
Ponoka County, a municipal district in Alberta, Canada
Ponoka (provincial electoral district)